The Sentinel Range is one of the northernmost sub-ranges of the Canadian Rockies, lying between Muncho Lake (SW) and the Liard River (N). The northernmost is the Terminal Range, so named for its position at the terminus of the Rockies, and lies to its west.

See also
Muncho Lake Provincial Park
Stone Mountain Provincial Park
Northern Rockies
Muskwa Ranges
Muncho Pass

References

Mountain ranges of British Columbia
Ranges of the Canadian Rockies
Liard Country